The Synergistota is a phylum of anaerobic bacteria that show Gram-negative staining and have rod/vibrioid cell shape. Although Synergistota have a diderm cell envelope, the genes for various proteins involved in lipopolysaccharides biosynthesis have not yet been detected in Synergistota, indicating that they may have an atypical outer cell envelope. The Synergistota inhabit a majority of anaerobic environments including animal gastrointestinal tracts, soil, oil wells, and wastewater treatment plants and they are also present in sites of human diseases such as cysts, abscesses, and areas of periodontal disease. Due to their presence at illness related sites, the Synergistota are suggested to be opportunistic pathogens but they can also be found in healthy individuals in the microbiome of the umbilicus and in normal vaginal flora. Species within this phylum have also been implicated in periodontal disease, gastrointestinal infections and soft tissue infections. Other species from this phylum have been identified as significant contributors in the degradation of sludge for production of biogas in anaerobic digesters and are potential candidates for use in renewable energy production through their production of hydrogen gas. All of the known Synergistota species and genera are presently part of a single class (Synergistia), order (Synergistiales), and family (Synergistaceae).

Comparative genomics and molecular signatures

Recent comparative analyses of sequenced Synergistota genomes have led to identification of large numbers of conserved signature indels (CSIs) in protein sequences that are specific for either all sequenced Synergistota species or some of their sub-clades that are observed in phylogenetic trees. Of the CSIs that were identified, 32 in widely distributed proteins such as RpoB, RpoC, UvrD, GyrA, PolA, PolC, MraW, NadD, PyrE, RpsA, RpsH, FtsA, RadA, etc., including a large >300 aa insert in the RpoC protein, are present in various Synergistota species, but except for isolated bacteria, these CSIs are not found in the protein homologues from all other organisms. These CSIs provide novel molecular markers for distinguishing Synergistota species from all other bacteria. Seven other CSIs in important proteins including a 13 aa in RpoB were found to be uniquely present in Jonquetella, Pyramidobacter and Dethiosulfovibrio species indicating a close and specific relationship among these bacteria, which is also strongly supported by phylogenetic trees. Fifteen addition CSIs that were only present in Jonquetella and Pyramidobacter indicate a close association between these two species. Lastly, a close relationship between the Aminomonas and Thermanaerovibrio species is also supported by 9 identified CSIs. The identified molecular markers provide reliable means for the division of species from the phylum Synergistota into intermediate taxonomic ranks such as families and orders.

Phylogeny

Taxonomy
The currently accepted taxonomy is based on the List of Prokaryotic names with Standing in Nomenclature (LSPN) and the National Center for Biotechnology Information (NCBI).

 Phylum Synergistota Jumas-Bilak et al. 2021
 Class Synergistia Jumas-Bilak et al. 2009
 Order Synergistales Jumas-Bilak et al. 2009
 Family Synergistaceae Jumas-Bilak et al. 2009 [Clostridiales Family XV; Thermosynergistaceae Yang et al. 2021]
 Genus Acetomicrobium Soutschek et al. 1985 [Anaerobaculum Rees et al. 1997]
 Species A. flavidum Soutschek et al. 1985
 Species A. hydrogeniformans (Maune & Tanner 2012) Ben Hania et al. 2016
 Species A. mobile (Menes & Muxi 2002) Ben Hania et al. 2016
 Species A. thermoterrenum (Rees et al. 1997) Ben Hania et al. 2016
 Genus Aminiphilus Díaz et al. 2007
 Species A. circumscriptus Díaz et al. 2007
 Genus Aminivibrio Honda et al. 2013
 Species A. pyruvatiphilus Honda et al. 2013
 Genus Aminobacterium Baena et al. 1999
 Species A. colombiense Baena et al. 1999 (type sp.)
 Species A. mobile Baena et al. 2000
 Species A. thunnarium Hamdi et al. 2015
 Genus Aminomonas Baena et al. 1999
 Species A. paucivorans Baena et al. 1999
 Genus "Candidatus Caccocola" Gilroy et al. 2021
 Species "Ca. C. faecigallinarum" Gilroy et al. 2021
 Species "Ca. C. faecipullorum" Gilroy et al. 2021
 Genus Cloacibacillus Ganesan et al. 2008 emend. Looft et al. 2013
 Species C. evryensis Ganesan et al. 2008
 Species C. porcorum Looft et al. 2013
 Genus Dethiosulfovibrio Magot et al. 1997
 Species D. salsuginis Díaz-Cárdenas et al. 2010
 Species D. peptidovorans Magot et al. 1997 (type sp.)
 Species D. acidaminovorans Surkov et al. 2001
 Species D. marinus Surkov et al. 2001
 Species D. russensis Surkov et al. 2001
 Genus Fretibacterium Vartoukian et al. 2013
 Species F. fastidiosum Vartoukian et al. 2013
 Genus Jonquetella Jumas-Bilak et al. 2007
 Species J. anthropi Jumas-Bilak et al. 2007
 Genus Lactivibrio Qiu et al. 2014
 Species L. alcoholicus Qiu et al. 2014
 Genus "Pacaella" Ndongo et al. 2017
 Species "P. massiliensis" Ndongo et al. 2017
 Genus Pyramidobacter Downes et al. 2009
 Species P. piscolens Downes et al. 2009
 Species P. porci Wylensek et al. 2021
 Genus Rarimicrobium Jumas-Bilak et al. 2015
 Species R. hominis Jumas-Bilak et al. 2015
 Genus Synergistes Allison et al. 1993
 Species S. jonesii Allison et al. 1993
 Genus "Candidatus Tammella" Hongoh et al. 2007
 Species "Ca. T. caduceiae" Hongoh et al. 2007
 Genus Thermanaerovibrio Baena et al. 1999 emend. Palaniappan et al. 2013 
 Species T. acidaminovorans (Guangsheng et al. 1997) Baena et al. 1999 [Selenomonas acidaminovorans Guangsheng et al. 1997] (type sp.)
 Species T. velox Zavarzina et al. 2000
 Genus Thermosynergistes Yang et al. 2021
 Species T. pyruvativorans Yang et al. 2021
 Genus Thermovirga Dahle and Birkeland 2006
 Species T. lienii Dahle and Birkeland 2006

References 

 
Subphyla